Abu Sayyaf is a Jihadist militant and pirate group in the Philippines.

Abu Sayyaf may also refer to:

Abu Sayyaf (ISIL leader), Fathi Ben Awn Ben Jildi Murad al-Tunisi (died 2015)
Abu Sayyaf (Jordan), Mohammad al-Shalabi, a Jordanian Salafi cleric

See also